In the United Kingdom, devolved matters are the areas of public policy where the Parliament of the United Kingdom has devolved its legislative power to the national assemblies of Scotland, Wales and Northern Ireland, while reserved matters and excepted matters are the areas where the Parliament retains exclusive power to legislate.

The devolved administrations in Scotland, Wales and Northern Ireland have been granted power by the Parliament under their respective legislators in all areas except those which are reserved (or excepted in the case of Northern Ireland). However, because the Parliament acts with sovereign supremacy, it is still able to pass legislation for all parts of the United Kingdom, including in relation to devolved matters.

Devolution of powers within the United Kingdom
The devolution of powers are set out in three main acts legislated by the UK Parliament for each of the devolved governments in Scotland, Wales and Northern Ireland. The acts also include subsequent amendments, which devolved further powers to the administrations:

 Northern Ireland Act 1998 amended by the Northern Ireland Act 2006.
 Scotland Act 1998 amended by the Scotland Act 2012 and the Scotland Act 2016.
 Government of Wales Act 1998 amended by the Government of Wales Act 2006, the Wales Act 2014 and the Wales Act 2017

In Northern Ireland, the powers of the Northern Ireland Assembly do not cover reserved matters or excepted matters. In theory, reserved matters could be devolved at a later date, but excepted matters were not supposed to be considered for further devolution. In practice, the difference is minor as Parliament is responsible for all the powers on both lists and must give its consent to devolve them.

In Scotland, a list of reserved matters is explicitly listed in the Scotland Act 1998 (and amended by the Scotland Acts of 2012 and 2016). Any matter not explicitly listed in the Act is implicitly devolved to the Scottish Parliament.

In Wales, a list of reserved matters is explicitly listed under the provisions of the Wales Act 2017. Any matter not explicitly listed in the Act is implicitly devolved to the Senedd. Before 2017, a list of matters was explicitly devolved to the then known National Assembly for Wales and any matter not listed in the Act was implicitly reserved to Westminster.

Devolution in Scotland and Wales

The devolution schemes in Scotland and Wales are set up in a similar manner. The Parliament of the United Kingdom has granted legislative power to the Scottish Parliament and the Senedd through the Scotland Act 1998 and the Government of Wales Act 2006 respectively. These Acts set out the matters still dealt with by the UK Government, referred to as reserved matters.

Anything not listed as a specific reserved matter in the Scotland Act or the Wales Act is devolved to that nation. However, the UK Parliament still has the power to legislate over devolved areas if it chooses.

The legal ability of the Scottish Parliament or Senedd to legislate (its "legislative competence") on a matter is largely determined by whether it is reserved or not.

List of devolved matters

 agriculture, fisheries, forestry and rural development
 culture
 economic development
 education and training
 environment
 fire and rescue services and promotion of fire safety
 food
 health and health services
 housing
justice and policing (in Scotland only)
 local government
 public administration
 social welfare
 sport and recreation
 tourism
 town and country planning
 water and flood defence

List of reserved matters

Reserved matters are subdivided into two categories: General reservations and specific reservations.

General reservations cover major issues which are always handled centrally by the Parliament in Westminster:

 the Crown
 the constitutional matters listed in Schedule 5 of the 1998 Act
 the UK Parliament
 registration and funding of political parties
 the making of peace or war
 international relations and treaties
 international development
 international trade
 the Civil Service of the United Kingdom
 defence
 treason

Additionally, in Wales, all matters concerning the single legal jurisdiction of England and Wales are reserved, including courts, tribunals, judges and legal proceedings. An exception allows the Senedd to create Wales-specific tribunals that are not concerned with reserved matters.

Specific reservations cover policy areas which can only be regulated by Westminster, listed under 'heads':

The reserved matters continue to be controversial in some quarters  and there are certain conflicts or anomalies. For example, in Scotland, the funding of Scottish Gaelic television is controlled by the Scottish Government, but broadcasting is a reserved matter, and while energy is a reserved matter, planning permission for power stations is devolved.

Previously transferred matters in Wales
Prior to the passage of the Wales Act 2017, issues were only devolved if outlined in the Government of Wales Act 1998 or the Government of Wales Act 2006.

Government of Wales Act 1998
The Government of Wales Act 1998 lists the following fields to be transferred to the National Assembly for Wales:

 agriculture, forestry, fisheries and food
 ancient monuments and historic buildings
 culture (including museums, galleries and libraries)
 economic development
 education and training
 the environment
 health and health services
 highways
 housing
 industry
 local government
 social services
 sport and recreation
 tourism
 town and country planning
 transport
 water and flood defence
 the Welsh language

Government of Wales Act 2006
The Government of Wales Act 2006 updated the list of fields, as follows:

 agriculture, fisheries, forestry and rural development
 ancient monuments and historic buildings
 culture
 economic development
 education and training
 environment
 fire and rescue services and promotion of fire safety
 food
 health and health services
 highways and transport
 housing
 local government
 the National Assembly for Wales
 public administration
 social welfare
 sport and recreation
 tourism
 town and country planning
 water and flood defence
 the Welsh language

Schedule 5 to the 2006 Act may be amended to add specific matters to the broad subject fields, thereby extending the legislative competence of the Assembly.

Devolution in Northern Ireland

Government of Ireland Act 1920

Devolution in Northern Ireland was originally provided for in the Government of Ireland Act 1920, which stated that the Parliament of Northern Ireland could not make laws in the following main areas:

 the Crown
 the Union with England, Scotland and Wales
 the making of peace or war
 the armed forces
 treaties or any relations with foreign states or dominions
 naturalization
 external trade
 navigation (including merchant shipping)
 submarine cables
 wireless telegraphy
 aerial navigation
 lighthouses
 currency
 copyright

This was the first practical example of devolution in the United Kingdom and followed three unsuccessful attempts to provide home rule for the whole island of Ireland:
 Government of Ireland Bill 1886
 Government of Ireland Bill 1893
 Government of Ireland Act 1914

Irish unionists initially opposed home rule, but later accepted it for Northern Ireland, where they formed a majority. (The rest of the island became independent as what is now the Republic of Ireland.)

Direct rule

The Parliament of Northern Ireland was suspended on 30 March 1972 by the Northern Ireland (Temporary Provisions) Act 1972, with Stormont's legislative powers being transferred to the Queen in Council.

Northern Ireland Constitution Act 1973
The Parliament of Northern Ireland was abolished outright by the Northern Ireland Constitution Act 1973; legislative competence was conferred instead on the Northern Ireland Assembly. The 1973 Act set out a list of excepted matters (sch. 2) and "minimum" reserved matters (sch. 3).

The new constitutional arrangements quickly failed, and the Assembly was suspended on 30 May 1974 having only passed two Measures.

Direct rule again
The Assembly was abolished under the Northern Ireland Act 1974, which transferred its law-making power to the Queen in Council once again. The 1974 framework of powers continued in place until legislative powers were transferred to the present Northern Ireland Assembly under the Northern Ireland Act 1998, following the Belfast Agreement of 10 April 1998.

Northern Ireland Act 1998

List of key excepted matters
Excepted matters are outlined in Schedule 2 of the Northern Ireland Act 1998:

 the Crown
 Parliament
 international relations
 international development
 defence
 weapons of mass destruction
 honours
 treason
 immigration and nationality
 taxation
 national insurance
 elections
 currency
 national security
 nuclear energy
 space

List of key reserved matters
Reserved matters are outlined in Schedule 3 of the Northern Ireland Act 1998:

 navigation (including merchant shipping)
 civil aviation
 The foreshore, sea bed and subsoil and their natural resources
 postal services
 import and export controls, external trade
 national minimum wage
 financial services
 financial markets
 intellectual property
 units of measurement
 telecommunications, broadcasting, internet services
 The National Lottery
 xenotransplantation
 surrogacy
 human fertilisation and embryology
 human genetics
 consumer safety in relation to goods

Devolution of policing and justice

After the suspension of the Parliament of Northern Ireland, policing and justice powers transferred to the UK Parliament and were subsequently administered by the Northern Ireland Office within the UK Government. These powers were not devolved after the Belfast Agreement.

The Hillsborough Castle Agreement on 5 February 2010 resulted in the following reserved powers being transferred to the Northern Ireland Assembly on 12 April 2010:
 criminal law
 policing
 prosecution
 public order
 courts
 prisons and probation

Some policing and justice powers remain reserved
to Westminster:
 the prerogative of mercy in terrorism cases
 drug classification
 the Serious Organised Crime Agency
 accommodation of prisoners in separated conditions
 parades
 security of explosives

A number of policing and justice powers remain excepted matters and were not devolved.
These include:
 extradition (as an international relations matter)
 military justice (as a defence matter)
 immigration
 national security (including intelligence services)

Parity

Northern Ireland has parity with Great Britain in three areas:
 social security
 child support
 pensions

Policy in these areas is technically devolved but, in practice, follows policy set by the Westminster Parliament to provide consistency across the United Kingdom.

References

External links

Legislation

Official guidance (published by the Cabinet Office)
Devolution Guidance
Devolution settlement: Scotland
Northern Ireland: What is Devolved?
Wales: What is Devolved?

Analysis
Constitution Unit, University College London
Devolution and Constitutional Change Programme

Government of the United Kingdom
Government of Scotland
Government of Northern Ireland
Government of Wales
Constitution of the United Kingdom
Devolution in the United Kingdom